Girl with a Mandolin is a 1910 painting within the Cubist movement by Pablo Picasso in Paris. The artwork was one of Picasso’s early Analytic Cubist creations. It currently forms part of the collection of The Museum of Modern Art in New York.

Artist and historian John Golding wrote in Cubism: A History and an Analysis, 1907-1914:

“The fact that at the time Picasso saw the work as unfinished, allows us an insight into his aesthetic intentions and his technical procedure. In the first place, that legibility of this canvas demonstrates conclusively that although cubist paintings were becoming more abstract in appearance, the artists were still deeply conditioned, at least in the early stages of their works, by the material existence and the physical appearance of their subjects.”

References 

Pablo Picasso
1910 works